Walking Too Fast (literally handcuffs or bonds) is a Czech thriller and drama film directed by Radim Špaček. It was released in 2010. It is a psychological story about relations between the secret police (StB) and the dissident movement, set in communist Czechoslovakia in the 1980s. The film was likened to the German film The Lives of Others.

Walking Too Fast is described as a dark thriller with an unpredictable protagonist who becomes dangerous to all people around including himself. His way to reach the goal is self-destructive.

Plot 
The story revolves around Antonín Rusnák who is an StB agent. He feels rage towards the world. He feels sick and bored from his family and work. His psychological issues cause him breathing problems and his doctor advises him to breathe into a bag if he gets a fit.

Antonín and his partner Martin surveil Tomáš and Pavel. They are both dissidents but Pavel is also collaborating with Antonín and Martin. Antonín finds out that Tomáš, who is married, has a lover, Klára. Antonín becomes interested in her. He secretly follows her and uses his authority to protect her. He beats up a guy who bothers her or prevents her boss from firing her because of her links to the dissidents. He also pushes Tomáš to leave the country to get rid of him. He beats him up during interrogations and reveals his affair to his family and Tomáš finally decides to leave Czechoslovakia.

Antonín forces Pavel to arrange a meeting with Klára in exchange for seeing his file. Pavel then meets Antonín's partner Martin in order to reveal the agreement he made with Antonín. Martin states that Antonín is done at StB but doesn't know that Antonín is aware of their meeting and lures Martin to the woods where he attacks him and threatens him with a gun. Martin begs him for his life and Antonín handcuffs him to a tree.

Antonín and Klára meet in Pavel's apartment. The meeting doesn't end well and Antonín gets a fit so he breathes into the bag which makes Klára realize that Antonín is the agent who terrorized Tomáš. He tells her that he followed her and she admits that she felt as if somebody was watching her for a long time. Antonín reveals his name and she says that he has to stop watching her.

Klára leaves the apartment but writes a message for Pavel on the Wall - "Svině" (Swine). Klára goes Home and meets the ambulance that takes her pregnant Friend Darina to the Hospital. She gets on the ambulance but looks around if anybody watches her. The film ends with Antonín waking up at the lakeside. The audience can now hear his thoughts as he enters the lake and goes deeper and deeper. He thinks about who he was and hopes that Klára will remember his name. In the end he states "It is beautiful here" as he kills himself.

Cast
 Ondřej Malý – Antonín Rusnák, a State Security agent
 Martin Finger – Tomáš Sýkora, a dissident
 Kristína Farkašová – Klára Kadlecová, Tomáš's lover
 Luboš Veselý – Pavel Veselý, an important figure in the dissident movement and a close friend to Tomáš 
 Lukáš Latinák – Martin Husár, Antonín's partner
 Barbora Milotová – Silvie Sýkorová – Tomáš's wife 
 Ivana Uhlířová – Darina, Klára's friend
 Oldřich Kaiser – Janeček, Antonín and Martin's boss
 Iva Pazderková – Miluška
 Jana Janěková – Šimková
 Monika Fingerová – Rusnák's wife
 Jiří Štrébl – Martinec
 Cyril Drozda – Doctor
 Natálie Drabiščáková – Anna Řeháková

Production
The film was inspired by 1995's Casino. Screenwriter Ondřej Štindl decided to make a similar story that would replace mobsters with agents of Communist State Security. The first version of screenwriting was made in 2002. Actors for the film were chosen in casting that took 18 months.

Shooting started in December 2008 and concluded in the summer of 2009. The film was shot in Prague, Ostrava and Bratislava. Post-production concluded in December 2009.

Release
The film premiered on 4 February 2010. The film returned to cinemas on 3 March 2011 as a reaction to its success at the Czech Lion Awards.

Awards 
The film received 13 nominations for the Czech Lion. It won five of them - Best Film, Best Director, Best Screenplay, Best Cinematography and Best Actor in Leading Role. The film also received the Film Critics' Award.

Walking Too Fast also succeeded at the Czech Film Critics' Awards. The film won awards in five categories - Best Film, Best Director, Best Screenplay, Best Actor in Leading Role and RWE Award.

Reception 
The film has won universal acclaim from critics in the Czech Republic. Out of all Czech films Walking too fast is number one on Czech movie aggregator Kinobox.cz where it holds 87% from critics. František Fuka considers it to be the best Czech film in the few last years if not the best since the Velvet revolution. The film holds 74% on Czech-Slovak Film Database.

Reviews
 Jaroslav Sedláček, Kinobox.cz, February 4, 2010 85%
 Kamil Fila, Aktuálně.cz, February 5, 2010 75%
 Kamila Boháčková, A2 3/2010
 Jan Gregor, Respekt 5/2010, February 1, 2010
 Vít Schmarc, MovieZone.cz, January 26, 2010 90%
 František Fuka, FFFilm, January 11, 2010 100%

Accolades

International festivals 
The film was shown at Karlovy Vary International Film Festival, Warsaw International Film Festival, Busan International Film Festival, East European Film Festival and Berlin International Film Festival.

References

External links 
 
 Czech-Slovak film database
 Official site

2009 films
2009 thriller drama films
2000s Czech-language films
Czechoslovakia in fiction
Communism in fiction
Czech thriller drama films
Czech neo-noir films
Czech Lion Awards winners (films)
Czech Film Critics' Awards winners
Golden Kingfisher winners
Czech psychological drama films
Czech psychological thriller films